Zolamine is an antihistamine and anticholinergic used as an antipruritic.

See also
Thonzylamine

References 

H1 receptor antagonists
Phenol ethers
Dimethylamino compounds
2-Thiazolyl compounds